William 'Willie' Hermiston (4 February 1913 — 7 January 1987) was a Scottish first-class cricketer and civil servant.

Hermiston was born in February 1913 at Makerstoun and was educated at Leith Academy. A club cricketer for Leith Franklin Cricket Club, Hermiston made two appearances in first-class cricket for Scotland in 1949. The first came against the touring New Zealanders at Glasgow in 1949, while the second came against Ireland at Belfast. He scored 35 runs in his two matches from the lower middle order, with a highest score of 21. With his right-arm fast-medium bowling, he took 2 wickets which came in the match against Ireland. Outside of cricket, Hermiston worked as a local government officer. He died at Edinburgh in January 1987.

References

External links
 

1913 births
1987 deaths
People from the Scottish Borders
People educated at Leith Academy
Scottish civil servants
Scottish cricketers